North Goulburn is a closed railway station on the Main South railway line in the town of Goulburn, New South Wales, Australia. It opened in 1882 and closed to passenger services in 1975. The privately owned red brick and sandstone Gatekeeper's cottage built in 1867, weatherboard signal box and platform all survive in good condition.

References

Railway stations in Australia opened in 1882
Railway stations closed in 1975
Disused regional railway stations in New South Wales
Main Southern railway line, New South Wales